Michaelis or Michelis is a surname. Notable people and characters with the surname include:
 Adolf Michaelis, German classical scholar
 Anthony R. Michaelis, German science writer
 Edward Michelis, German theologian
 Georg Michaelis, German politician
 Gustav Adolf Michaelis, German obstetrician and namesake of the rhombus of Michaelis
 Hans-Thorald Michaelis, German historian
 Johann David Michaelis, German biblical scholar
 John H. Michaelis, American four-star general
 Laura Michaelis, American linguist
 Leo Michelis, Greek-Canadian economist
 Leonor Michaelis, German scientist known for Michaelis–Menten kinetics
 Max Michaelis, South African financier
 Margaret Michaelis-Sachs, Austrian-Australian photographer
 Paul Charles Michaelis, American scientist
 Peter Michaelis, German botanist
 Robert Michaelis (1878–1965), French-born actor and singer who settled in England
 Sebastian Michaelis, the demon butler from Kuroshitsuji
 Sebastien Michaelis, French inquisitor and writer of Michaelis' classification of demons
 Susanne Maria Michaelis, German linguist

See also
 De Michelis (disambiguation)
 Michaelis–Arbuzov reaction, a chemical reaction
 St. Michaelis, Hamburg